The Mizo religion, also known as Lushai animism, is an indigenous monotheistic ethnic religion that was practiced by the majority of the Mizo people before conversions to Christianity which started with the British annexation of the region. As of the 2001 census, 1,367 people practiced the Mizo religion.

Beliefs

Pathian
Pathian is the supreme God who according to the Mizo was the Supreme being that created the Universe and also the creator of the world and all that there is in it. The tribal Mizos had great respect for Pathian as he was believed to be kind-hearted and would always help them. They believe that Pathian blesses the righteous with blessings and good fortunes, and punishes the wicked with calamities and misfortunes. 

It was believed that the Duhlian/Lushai language speakers started worshipping Pathian and started having a Sakhua for themselves around 16th century AD when Hualthana, who was the son of Seipuia, the Hualngo Chief of Seipui village (which is located in Myanmar) had a calling from God in his dream. According to his dream, a person was talking to him (Hualthana) on Muchhip mountain and said,"I am your ancestors' God.I am the one who made you. Worship me and I will bless you and I will always protect you". By hearing this, Hualthana believed that he was spoken to him by God and with the help of his wife Neihhrimi, he tried to find a ways to worship Him. They killed a Vawkpa Sut Nghak and started using Sakung for worshipping the Lushai Sakhua. After this incident, all the Duhlian/Lushai language speakers who dwells near and inside the Seipui village started worshipping the Muchhip mountain. Even after they leaved the Seipui village,they continued to worship the Muchhip mountain and they always included the names of Hualthana and Neihhrimi in their prayers.

Khuanu
Khuanu is another name for Pathian. The term 'Khuanu' in Lushai/Duhlian/Mizo language mean 'Mother of Nature. As Mizo Sakhua is monotheistic,Pathian was known in different names. The Mizo regarded Pathian as a benevolent mother that always watches over them.

Vana - Vana is another name for Pathian. The meaning of the word 'Vana' means 'Sky' and Mizo people used to called Him Pu Vana meaning Mr Sky. Since from time immemorial, Mizo beleived that there is a God, a creator in the sky, who is good in nature and who is always ready to help them whenever they are in need. Since they don't know His true name, they used to called Him Pu Vana.

As Mizo people don't know the true name of God, they used to call Him by different names such as Khawzing,Pathian,Pu Vana,Khuanu,Fangrawng. The times when they used to call Him by these names depends on the situations they're in. During the cultivation of crops,the Mizo called God as Fangrawng. During the times of sadness,they called Him Vana.Just because these names are not similar doesn't mean Mizo Sakhua is Polytheistic.

Benevelont spirits
Khuavang are benevolent spirits who have never caused harm to people, but rather help in their difficulties, and thus they are good spirits. They are thought to live in high places, most likely on a mountain or hill. Khuavang is a symbol of kindness and greatness. Khuavang bestows on humans a large number of children and long married life.Vanchungnula are believed to be beautiful creatures whose appearances is alike that of a human and have wings like an angel. One notable Vanchungnula was Sichangneii who used to come down from the sky so that she could bathe in the pond. She was later captured by a man who became her husband.

Sakhua spirit: The word Sakhua is made up of two words: sa and khua. Sa is the creator and progenitor of a tribe, clan, or race, and khua is the protector who bestows well-being on humans. Sakhua is the god of a family or a clan. 

Every Zo hnahthlak's Chi is named after its progenitor and because of this, there are some chi that have some affinity and are related and some chi that are different from each other. The Chi that have affinity are called Dawisa Kil za thei". Each Zohnahthlak's Chi (Clan) and Sakhua is strongly joint and their Sakhua and Chi cannot be seperated. That means for example, if a person was a Ralte then his Sakhua is also Ralte. By being a Ralte chi (clan), he can't clung to the Lushai Sakhua,Hmar Sakhua or the Pawi Sakhua. Just like that,a person cannot be a Ralte if he clungs to the Paite Sakhua. If a person clungs to a Hnamte Sakhua, the his chi will also be Hnamte. 

Even though several Zo clans have their differences in their way of worshipping their Sakhua which is called "Sakhaw hmang", it can be said that their ways of worshipping Sakhua are similar and within Sakhua, their ways of performing sacred rituals, it's time and places are different. In their worshipping of Sakhua called "Sakhaw hmang",there are animals which can be killed and can be eaten only in the morning and animals that can be killed and can be eaten only after the star appears. Generally, the things they used for performing sacred rituals and sacrifices are hung on the wall by the people who knot their hair on the forehead;and some people who used to knot their hair on the back of their head used to hung it on the back of the outside wall and the Lushai used to hung it on the outside of the house.

In their worshipping of Sakhua,there are things that can only be perform with the chi that have shared similarities/affinities with them and things that no other clans can participate in it and some things that are strictly prohibited for other clans to join. To give us an idea, if a Pawi chi performs Arhnuaichhiah, no other chi (clans) can participate in it. If a Kawlni have performed Hnuaipui, no other chi except for the Lelhchhun can participate in it. No other chi can participate when Ralte,Khelte and Lutmang have performed Hnuaipui. No other chi can participate in the Kawngpui siam,Fano dawi,Hnuapui and Sechhun in the place where the Lushai people rule. If the Zahau clan performs Tualsa hem,chawn and sechhun, no other chi can participate in it. If the Tlau performs Hrichhung, only the Tlau can participate in it. If the Paite performs sumchawng, no other chi can participate in it. In their way of performing Sakhua for their own chi,they cannot use their son-in-law for tufa who belongs to the other chi and even their children and grandchildren,and other chi cannot participate in it.

All these complex tasks of performing and fulfilling sacred rituals and sacrifices leads to a common aim that is called "Thangchhuah". Thangchhuah is a key for going to Pialral. To be able to "Thangchhuah", a person must perform Khuangchawi. Performing Khuangchawi is very costly and it can only be fulfilled by the rich and powerful people. All their sacrifices and rituals got bigger and bigger and after they have fulfilled all their tasks,they used to perform Khuangchawi. In this Khuangchawi,every clans, every tribes who belongs to the Zo community can participate in it.
.

Khaltu or guardian spirit The "Khaltu" spirit was associated with people's lives and well-being. Every living creature was also thought to have a "thla" (soul), and as long as the soul remained in the body, the person was considered to be alive. If a person had a terrifying experience, such as being mauled by wild animals or captured by an enemy, the soul was similarly terrified, and a sacrifice was required to restore proper and normal relations with the "khaltu." When the experience became truly terrifying, a goat was sacrificed; the tail was severed and tied around the neck with a string. Breaking this string was a serious offense for the Mizo.

Lasi: Lasi according to Mizo legends are spirits that are the protectors of the forests and animals as well as the spirits that took care of the animals. According to Zo beliefs,the Lasi can bless the Hunters/Warriors to be lucky in hunting wild animals and also bless the warriors or hunters to live long. These Lasi often appeared as beautiful women to warrior. If a person falls in love with a Lasi, he would be blessed. 

According to Mizo legends, Chawngtinleri was the Queen of the Lasi and was married to the Lasi King of the Tan Tlang. Mizo elders used to say that Chawngtinleri was once a beautiful human being. She was so beautiful that no human beings in the earth could match her beautiness and the Lasi King too don't miss that news. The Lasi King ordered his Servants to take away Chawngtinleri to become his wife and make her the Queen of the Tan Tlang Lasi.

Malevolent spirits
Mizos believed in the existence of malevolent evil spirits who were believed to cause human misery, suffering, and misfortunes. Numerous spirits were mentioned in accordance with their abodes.

Ramhuai means "the malignant spirit of the forest or jungle," and they were found throughout the 'jhum' and forest. They frequently haunted people and took on various disguises.

Hmuithla was an evil spirit that was thought to afflict both humans and animals. This spirit roams the night looking for humans and animals on the verge of death. 

Phung was a spirit that was dark in colour and colossal, and was believed to caused humans to suffer from insanity and epilepsy. Convulsions or spasms in children were also thought to be caused by "phung's" displeasure.

Khawhring spirits would watch people's food and drink with evil eyes. Because these spirits possessed food and drink, the Mizos would offer a portion of their food to the evil spirits before eating and drinking. If someone was thought to be possessed by "khawhring," it was almost legal to kill that person.

Revival
Hnam Sakhua is a modernized traditional Mizo religion that places a special emphasis on the Mizo culture and seeks to revive traditional Mizo values while opposing the influence of Christianity on the Mizo people.

References

Mizoram
 
Asian ethnic religion